The Evrytania Football Clubs Association (Ένωση Ποδοσφαιρικών Σωματείων Νομού Ευρυτανίας = Enosi Podosfairikon Somateion Nomou Evrytanias, short form: Ε.Π.Σ.Ν.Ε. = E.P.S.N.E.) is a football (soccer) organization in Evrytania that is part of the Greek Football Federation. It was formed in 1990.  It was like an autonomous union, from 1974 until 1985, teams participated in the Fthiotida-Fokida FCA and up to 1990, the Fthiotida FCA.  Its offices are located in Valaoritou 3 in Karpenissi (telephone (30)-22370-80350)

The jurisdiction which subjects organizations of the local cup and championship.  During the 2011-12 season in the men's category, it sustained two divisions.  The premier division with only 10 clubs and the second division with only 3 clubs.

The winner of the first division participates in the playoffs, takes part in the entry into the Fourth Division, the team who finishes last relegates.

Titles

Championships

Cup

2011-12 season
Points (Final)
Team-Points-Results

Katsantonis Agrafa 46 (68-11)
Krendi 41 (42-16)
Aiolos Profiti Ilia Karpenissi 40 (45-12)
Myriki FC 35 (25-13)
Potamia 24 (24-26)
Aperadiakos Valaora 21 (-2 points) (20-28)
Doxa Raptopoulo 18 (32-27)
Fragkista 13 (19-55)
Agios Prokopios 10 (20-48)
Kerassovo FC 3 (12-60)

Final Four
As of Apr 21, 2012

Semi-finals

Myriki-Katsandonis 0-2, 1-1
Aiolos-Krendi 1-1, 2-2

Final
 Karpenissi Public Stadium (Apr 22 & 28, 2012)
Aiolos Profiti Ilia-Katsandonis Agrafa

Cup Final
APOK To Velouchi-Katsandoni Agrafa 6-0

References

External links
Alexandros Mastrogiannopoulos "Greek Amateur Soccer" 
onsports.gr 
Athlitiko Icho, the electronic sports archive newspaper 
Evrytanikos Palmos - the newspaper 
Panagiotis Kallimenos Evrytania Sport 
Evrytanika Nea (Eurytanian News) 

Evrytania
Association football governing bodies in Greece
1990 establishments in Greece
Sports organizations established in 1990